Cyana rufeola is a moth of the family Erebidae. It was described by Timm Karisch and Ugo Dall'Asta in 2010. It is found in Cameroon, the Central African Republic and the Democratic Republic of the Congo.

References

Cyana
Moths described in 2010
Insects of the Democratic Republic of the Congo
Fauna of the Central African Republic
Moths of Africa